Londres may refer to:

Locations
 London, capital of the United Kingdom and England, called Londres in French, Spanish, Portuguese, Catalan, Galician, and Filipino
 Londres, Catamarca, Argentina, formally "San Juan de la Ribera de Londres" or "Londres de la Nueva Inglaterra"
 Londres, Lot-et-Garonne, a former commune of France, now part of Puymiclan
 Nueva Londres, a town in the Caaguazú department of Paraguay

People with the surname
 Albert Londres (1884–1932), French journalist and writer
 Richie Londres, also known as Altered Beats, English musician, hip hop record producer, lead guitarist and multi-instrumentalist

Other uses 
Albert Londres Prize, prize in the name of Albert Londres
Radio Londres, a radio broadcast from 1940 to 1944 from the BBC in London to Nazi occupied France
 Londres Nova, Mars, capital of the Martian Congressional Republic in the Expanse series

See also
 London (disambiguation)